Estelle Harman (September 11, 1922 – April 30, 1995) was an American acting coach in Los Angeles.

Biography
Harman began as an acting instructor at UCLA in the 1950s, then was hired by Universal Studios as Head of Talent to groom their stable of film actors, which included Rock Hudson, Bill Bixby, Tony Curtis, Myrna Hansen, and Audie Murphy.

As the contract years ended in Hollywood, she started her own school — the Estelle Harman Actors Workshop.  It operated two theatres, an on-camera class and offered a curriculum that met federal requirements for financial aid. The school closed shortly before her death on April 30, 1995.

The list of movie actors that studied with her is lengthy, many of whom went on to successful acting careers in hollywood movies and television. Her teaching emphasized the "independent actor" who could utilize the tools of different acting approaches (Sanford Meisner, Konstantin Stanislavski) without having to be dogmatic about any of them.

References

External links
 Estelle Karchmer Harman obituary, latimes.com; accessed December 23, 2017.

University of California, Los Angeles staff
American acting coaches
1922 births
1995 deaths
People from Beaumont, Texas
People from Greater Los Angeles